Mikko Larkas (born 22 June 1981) is a Finnish professional basketball coach, currently head coach of the Helsinki Seagulls.

Further, he has been the assistant coach of Finland’s national basketball team.

References

External links
 Eurobasket.com profile
 RealGM profile

1981 births
Living people
Basketball coaches
Finnish basketball coaches
Sportspeople from Espoo